The Ascension with Christ giving the Keys to Saint Peter is a rectangular stiacciato marble relief sculpture of  by Donatello, now in the Victoria and Albert Museum in London.

It is an unusual subject, combining the Ascension of Christ and Christ's giving the keys of the kingdom to Saint Peter. It may form part of a series of works for private devotion which the artist produced at that time, but more probably it decorated the original altar in the Cappella Brancacci, or perhaps the base of the Saint Peter niche at Orsanmichele.

References

External links
 

Marble sculptures
1430s sculptures
Sculptures by Donatello
Cultural depictions of Saint Peter
Sculptures of the Victoria and Albert Museum